Seyadu Abdul Raheem (9 August 1921 – 1989) was a Sri Lankan Muslim diplomat, politician and Member of Parliament.

Early life
Raheem was born on 9 August 1921. He was educated at St. Xavier's Boys' College, Jaffna Central College and Jaffna College.

Career
Raheem entered local politics in 1960, serving as chairman of Mannar Town Council between 1962 and 1972.

Raheem contested the 1970 parliamentary election as the United National Party's candidate in Mannar but was defeated by incumbent V. A. Alegacone of the Illankai Tamil Arasu Kachchi. Alegacone died on 25 November 1973, Raheem contested the ensuing by-election on 25 February 1974 and was elected to Parliament.

Later life
Raheem was appointed High Commissioner to Kenya in 1978. He was also Sri Lanka's representative at the Habitat International Coalition, founder member of the Moors’ Islamic Cultural Home, vice president of the All Ceylon Muslim League, vice chairman Paddy Marketing Board and director of the  Sri Lanka Cashew Corporation. He died in 1989.

References

1921 births
1989 deaths
Alumni of Jaffna Central College
Alumni of Jaffna College
Alumni of St. Xavier's Boys' College
High Commissioners of Sri Lanka to Kenya
Members of the 7th Parliament of Ceylon
People from Northern Province, Sri Lanka
People from British Ceylon
Sri Lankan Moor politicians
Sri Lankan Muslims
United National Party politicians